The 1992 Eastwood District Council election for the Eastwood District Council took place in May 1992, alongside elections to the councils of Scotland's various other districts.

The Conservatives again maintained their dominance of the council, winning 56% of the vote and two-thirds of the Districts' seats.

Aggregate results

References

1992 Scottish local elections
1992